Viktoras Olšanskis (born 14 March 1969) is a Lithuanian former professional footballer. He was playing the position of midfielder and is 1.79 m tall and weighs 78 kg. He is a former member of the Lithuania national football team.

Honours
 Baltic Cup
 1992

External links
 

1969 births
Living people
FC Flora players
FC Haka players
FK Žalgiris players
FC Anzhi Makhachkala players
FC Baltika Kaliningrad players
Skonto FC players
FK Atlantas players
FK Sirijus Klaipėda players
Expatriate footballers in Estonia
Lithuanian footballers
Lithuanian expatriate footballers
Lithuania international footballers
Expatriate footballers in Russia
Expatriate footballers in Finland
Russian Premier League players
Veikkausliiga players
Association football midfielders
JK Tervis Pärnu players
Meistriliiga players
Lithuanian expatriate sportspeople in Estonia
Lithuanian expatriate sportspeople in Finland
Lithuanian expatriate sportspeople in Russia
Expatriate footballers in Switzerland
Lithuanian expatriate sportspeople in Switzerland
Expatriate footballers in Latvia
Lithuanian expatriate sportspeople in Latvia
Expatriate footballers in Germany
Lithuanian expatriate sportspeople in Germany